The University of Cincinnati College of Education, Criminal Justice, and Human Services is a college of the University of Cincinnati and is located in Teachers College and Dyer Hall on the university's main campus in Cincinnati, Ohio. The college, referred to as CECH, is composed of four schools: Criminal Justice, Education, Human Services and Information Technology.

Established as the College for Teachers in 1905, it was renamed the College of Education, Criminal Justice & Human Services in 2003. CECH has educated students from all 50 states and 73 countries and offers doctoral, specialist, masters, baccalaureate, associate, and certificate programs leading to careers in teaching, counseling, criminal justice, health promotion, legal assisting, and related academic, leadership, and social service fields.  Current enrollment is over 5,000, with 30,133 active alumni. Since opening in 1905, CECH has graduated a total of 37,236 students. CECH has 134 full-time faculty, with a student faculty ratio of 14:1. Sixty-five scholarship types are awarded by CECH to students. In 2009, Teachers College completed a major renovation with improvements to Dyer Hall currently in progress.

Organizational Units

School of Criminal Justice
Criminal Justice
Legal Assistant
Legal Assisting Technology
Paralegal Studies

School of Education
Curriculum and Instruction
Early Childhood Education
Educational Studies
Instructional Design and Technology
Literacy and Second Language Studies
Middle Childhood Education
Secondary Education
Signed Language Interpreting
Special Education
Teacher Science
Urban Educational Leadership

School of Human Services
Athletic Training
Counseling
Health Promotion & Education
School Psychology
Sport Administration
Substance Abuse Counseling

School of Information Technology
Information Technology (Networking/Systems, Software Application Development, Cybersecurity Track)

CECH Centers
Action Research Center
Arlitt Center for Education, Research, and Sustainability 
CECH PASS-Partner for Achieving School Success
Center for Criminal Justice Research
Center for Ecological Counseling
Center for English as a Second Language
Center for International Education & Research
Center for Prevention Studies
Center for Student Success
Center for Studies Jewish Education & Culture
Evaluation Services Center
FUSION Center
Literacy Research and Innovation Center
Office of Assessment and Continuous Improvement
Student Services Center
Corrections Institute
Urban Center for Social Justice, Peace Education & Research
Economics Center

Student organizations
Alpha Phi Sigma (Criminal Justice Honor Society)
CECH Student Ambassadors
CECH Tribunal
The Center for the ESL Community
Criminal Justice Society
Eta Sigma Gamma (National Health Education Honorary)
Future Educators Association
Graduate Education Association
Graduate Student Association
Information Technology Student Association
Kappa Delta Pi (Education Honor Society)
REHABCATS
Sport Administration Majors Club
STEM Club
Student Council for Exceptional Children
Students for the Education of Young Children
Student Organization for Action Research (SOAR)
Upsilon Chi Chi chapter of Chi Sigma Iota
Women in Technology
Cybercrime Cats

Rankings and recognition
The annual survey of America's top graduate schools conducted by U.S. News & World Report ranks CECH overall at 55th in the nation's Education Graduate Programs.

The Division of Criminal Justice was ranked #1 nationally in terms of research productivity, according to the Journal of Criminal Justice. U.S. News & World Report ranks the Division of Criminal Justice's doctoral program as the #3 program in the nation.

References

External links
UC College of Education, Criminal Justice, and Human Services official site

http://grad-schools.usnews.rankingsandreviews.com/best-graduate-schools/top-education-schools/university-of-cincinnati-06162

University of Cincinnati
Educational institutions established in 1905
1905 establishments in Ohio